Dolno Jabolčište is a village in the municipality of Čaška, North Macedonia.

Demographics
According to the 2021 census, the village had a total of 1.047 inhabitants. Ethnic groups in the village include:

Albanians 1021
Bosniaks 1
Others 25

References

External links

Villages in Čaška Municipality
Albanian communities in North Macedonia